Pete Dunne is an American author, famous for his writings on natural history and birding. He is also the founder of the World Series of Birding, as well as the former director of the Cape May Bird Observatory, Birding Ambassador for the New Jersey Audubon Society, and former publisher of New Jersey Audubon magazine. His articles have appeared in most major American birding publications, including Birder's World, Birding, Bird Watcher's Digest, and WildBird, as well as in The New York Times.  In 2001, he received the Roger Tory Peterson Award from the American Birding Association for lifetime achievement in promoting the cause of birding.

Selected books 
 Tales of a Low-Rent Birder
 More Tales of a Low-Rent Birder
 The Feather Quest: A North American Birder's Year
 Hawks in Flight: A Guide to Identification of Migrant Raptors (with David Sibley and Clay Sutton)
 The Wind Masters: Lives of North American Birds of Prey
 Before the Echo: Essays on Nature
 Hawk Watch, A Guide for Beginners
 Pete Dunne on Bird Watching: The How-to, Where-to, and When-to of Birding
 Pete Dunne's Essential Field Guide Companion: A Comprehensive Resource for Identifying North American Birds
 The Art of Pishing: How to Attract Birds by Mimicking Their Calls
 Prairie Spring: A Journey Into the Heart of a Season
 The Art of Bird Finding
 Bayshore Summer: Finding Eden in a Most Unlikely Place
 Arctic Autumn: A Journey To Season's Edge

References

Birdwatching
American male writers
Living people
Year of birth missing (living people)